Clair Lee "Duke" Shirey (June 20, 1898 – September 1, 1962) was a Major League Baseball pitcher who played for the Washington Senators in .

External links

1898 births
1962 deaths
Major League Baseball pitchers
Baseball players from Pennsylvania
Washington Senators (1901–1960) players